Kelfield may refer to:
Kelfield, Lincolnshire, England
Kelfield, North Yorkshire, England
Kelfield, Saskatchewan, Canada